Sir Frank Arnold Gunasekera, CBE, ED was a Ceylonese physician and surgeon. He was elected a Deputy President of the Senate of Ceylon in 1948.

Early life and education
He was educated at the Royal College, Colombo and at the Ceylon Medical College, where he gained his Licentiate in Medicine and Surgery (LMS). He took further medical studies in the United Kingdom, gaining Membership (MRCS) of the Royal College of Surgeons of Edinburgh, Royal College of Physicians and Surgeons of Glasgow and Licentiate of the Royal College of Physicians (LRCP). His brothers were Eric Gunasekera and Donald Gunasekera; the former was headmaster of Wesley College, Colombo.

Medical career
Gunasekera joined the Ceylon Medical Service and served in the Ceylon Medical Corps as a medical officer. He served as its commanding officer from 1935 to 1939 with the rank of lieutenant colonel.

Political career
Gunasekera was elected a member of the Colombo Municipal Council from 1940 to 1944. Appointed to the Senate of Ceylon in 1947, he was elected its Deputy President in 1948 and served till 1951.

Honors
For his volunteer military service he was awarded the Efficiency Decoration and the appointed Commander of the British Empire in the 1948 Birthday Honours. He was knighted as a Knights Bachelor in the 1950 New Year Honours

The Sir Frank Gunasekera Trophy is awarded annually at the cricket match between Royal College Colombo and Wesley College, Colombo, which has been played since 1893. The Sir Frank Gunasekera Trust is one of the largest donors of the National Diabetes Centre.

References

Alumni of Royal College, Colombo
Members of the Senate of Ceylon
Sri Lankan surgeons
Sri Lankan philanthropists
Ceylonese Knights Bachelor
Sri Lankan military doctors
Ceylon Medical Corps officers
Ceylonese Commanders of the Order of the British Empire
Ceylonese lieutenant colonels